Robet Zack Bronson (born January 28, 1974) is a cornerbacks coach at McNeese State and a former professional American football safety in the National Football League. He played professionally for the San Francisco 49ers his entire NFL career from 1997 to 2003.

Early life
Bronson was born in Jasper, Texas, and graduated from Jasper High School (Jasper, Texas). He attended McNeese State University.

Professional career
Bronson went undrafted in the 1997 NFL Draft, and subsequently signed with the San Francisco 49ers. During his rookie year, Bronson recorded 24 tackles and an interception. The following year, Bronson, splitting playing time with Tim McDonald at safety, led the team in interceptions with four. In 2001, Bronson set the record for the longest interception return in franchise history against the Chicago Bears, returning the pick 97 yards for a touchdown.

He played professionally for eight seasons, but suffered a neck injury that hampered his performance and eventually led to his retirement. Bronson ended his career with 191 tackles, 19 interceptions (two returned for touchdowns) and 32 passes defended.

Coaching career
Bronson started coaching in 2007 as a graduate assistant for his alma mater, McNeese State. He then went on to be a head coach at two high schools, one in Houston and one in Beaumont, both in Texas. He went back to McNeese in 2016 and has served as an assistant coach and cornerbacks coach since then.

References

External links
 databaseFootball.com
 Pro-Football-Reference.Com

Bronson, Zach
Bronson, Zach
Bronson, Zach
Bronson, Zach
Bronson, Zach
McNeese Cowboys football players
People from Jasper, Texas